Dion Elie Charles (born 7 October 1995) is a professional footballer who plays as a forward for Bolton Wanderers. Born in England, he represents the Northern Ireland national team.

Club career

Blackpool
Charles was born in Preston, Lancashire. After rising through the youth ranks at Blackpool, he was named on the bench to face Barnsley during the 2013–14 campaign, in the 1–0 victory at Bloomfield Road on 10 August. he scored the winning goal in the 85th minute

Fylde
Preceding his release from Blackpool, Charles joined Conference North side AFC Fylde on a one-year deal. On 12 August 2014, he made his debut in a 3–0 away defeat against Stalybridge Celtic, replacing Richie Allen in the 80th minute. He scored his first goal in a 5–0 victory over Colwyn Bay 13 days later. He scored three more times before he joined Northern Premier League Premier Division side Skelmersdale United on a one-month loan in November. 

On 15 August 2015, Charles opened his 2015–16 campaign by scoring both goals in a 2–2 draw against Gainsborough Trinity. On the same day, he signed a new two-year deal with, and also received a call-up for the England C contingency squad. On 23 January 2016, Charles registered his 10th league goal of the season, in a 3–2 home defeat against Worcester City.

Fleetwood
On 11 July 2016, Charles joined League One side Fleetwood Town on a two-year deal. A day later, Charles' former club, AFC Fylde criticised Fleetwood Town, after they believed the player was still contracted to the National League North side. In September 2015, Fylde announced that Charles had signed a new two-year deal, however, The Football Association came out and announced that there was no evidence of this. This therefore, meant that Fleetwood were eligible to sign him on a free transfer. On 9 November 2016, he made his debut in an EFL Trophy tie against Carlisle United, in which Fleetwood lost 4–2 away.

On 18 March 2017, Charles joined National League North side Halifax Town on loan until the end of the 2016–17 campaign. On the same day, he made his debut in their 1–0 home defeat against Gloucester City, featuring for 63 minutes before being replaced by Adam Morgan. A week later, he scored his first goal in their 3–0 away victory over FC United of Manchester, netting the opener in the 10th minute. On 22 July, Charles rejoined Halifax Town on a six-month loan. He featured twelve times before returning to Fleetwood in January 2018.

Southport
On 12 January 2018, Charles joined National League North side Southport for an undisclosed fee.

Accrington Stanley
On 12 August 2019 Charles joined Accrington Stanley on a two-year deal for an undisclosed fee. He made his debut for the League One team five days later, as a 76th-minute substitute for Courtney Baker-Richardson in a 1–1 draw at AFC Wimbledon. and on 20 August he came off the bench after half an hour and scored in a 3–2 home loss to Shrewsbury Town. He totalled nine goals in 40 games over all competitions, including the penalty equaliser in a 3–3 draw with ten men at Bristol Rovers on 7 September, and a strike in a 7–1 home win over Bolton Wanderers on 23 November, in which he assisted another goal and won a penalty.

In 2020–21, Charles was League One's joint fifth top scorer with 19 goals, as Stanley came 11th. This included a hat-trick on 2 February 2021 in a 6–1 home win over Bristol Rovers.

Bolton Wanderers
On 1 January 2022, Charles joined fellow League One side Bolton Wanderers on a three-and-a-half year deal for an undisclosed fee reported to be £320,000. It was the first time since Wanderers signed Charles' international team mate Josh Magennis in 2018 that the club had paid a transfer fee for a player. On 11 February 2023, in Bolton’s 5000th league game, he scored a hat-trick in 5-0 win against Peterborough United.

International career
In March 2021, Charles was called up to the Northern Ireland senior team for the first time for the 2022 World Cup Qualifiers. He debuted in a friendly 2–1 loss to the United States on 28 March 2021.

Career statistics

International

References

External links

1995 births
Living people
Footballers from Preston, Lancashire
Association footballers from Northern Ireland
English footballers
Association football forwards
Northern Ireland international footballers
Northern Ireland youth international footballers
Northern Ireland under-21 international footballers
English people of Northern Ireland descent
Blackpool F.C. players
AFC Fylde players
Skelmersdale United F.C. players
Fleetwood Town F.C. players
FC Halifax Town players
Southport F.C. players
Accrington Stanley F.C. players
Bolton Wanderers F.C. players
English Football League players
National League (English football) players
Northern Premier League players